Zandvoorde is a village in the Belgian province of West Flanders and a part (deelgemeente) of the municipality of Zonnebeke. Zandvoorde is a rural village, in the rolling landscape of the southern part of the province.

History
Old listings of the place date back to 1102, as Sanfort. "Sant" refers to sand (in modern Dutch: zand), "fort" refers to Ford (in modern Dutch: voorde), a shallow crossing in a watercourse.

The village was completely destroyed during World War I. Among those killed there was the German poet Ernst Stadler, drafted to the German army.

Landmarks
 The Parish and its church are named after Saint Bartholomew. The current church dates from 1923–1925, after the old church had been destroyed during the First World War.
 The Zantvoorde British Cemetery is a Commonwealth War Graves Commission World War I military cemetery. In the village centre, there is a British war memorial, The Household Cavalry Monument.

Trivia
 In the north of the province of West Flanders, there's another village with the name Zandvoorde, a part of the city of Ostend

Zonnebeke
Populated places in West Flanders